Freddie Williams Jr. (September 2, 1955 – May 14, 2014) was an American football running back in the Canadian Football League (CFL) for the Saskatchewan Roughriders. He played college football at Arizona State University.

Early years
Williams attended Dixie Hollins High School. He accepted a football scholarship from Arizona State University. His teammates gave him the nickname "Fast Freddie". 

As a sophomore, he was named the starter at running back after Woody Green graduated. He had a breakout season, leading the Western Athletic Conference in several categories. He posted 249 carries (led the conference), 1,299 rushing yards (led the conference), a 5.2-yard average (led the conference) and 8 rushing touchdowns (second in the conference). He had 23 carries for 216 yards (ninth in school history) and 2 rushing touchdowns against UTEP.

As a junior, he helped the team finish with an undefeated record (12–0),ranking # 2 in both the AP Poll and the Coaches Poll, whis is the highest ranking in school history. The season included a dramatic 17-14 Fiesta Bowl win over the University of Nebraska. Williams also had one of the best rushing seasons in school history, tallying 266 carries (school record) for 1,427 yards, a 5.4-yard average, 9 rushing touchdowns and 8 100-yard games.

As a senior, he was limited with an ankle injury, registering 102 carries (second on the team) for 523 rushing yards (led the team), a 5.1-yard average (led the team), without scoring a touchdown. He finished second in school history with 648 carries for 3,381 rushing yards and 17 100-yard games, while also averaging 5.4 per carry and scoring 19 touchdowns.

In 2002, he was inducted into the Arizona State University Sports Hall of Fame.

Professional career
Williams was selected by the Dallas Cowboys in the eighth round (221st overall) of the 1977 NFL Draft. He was waived on August 1.

In August 1977, he signed with the Saskatchewan Roughriders of the Canadian Football League. In his debut against the Calgary Stampeders, he had 87 rushing yards, a 6.7-yard average and 2 touchdowns. In his second game against the Winnipeg Blue Bombers, he suffered torn ligaments in his left ankle and did not return to play during the season.

Personal life
Williams died on May 14, 2014.

References

1955 births
2014 deaths
Players of American football from St. Petersburg, Florida
Players of Canadian football from St. Petersburg, Florida
American football running backs
Canadian football running backs
Arizona State Sun Devils football players
Saskatchewan Roughriders players
Dixie Hollins High School alumni